The Anarch Lord is a novel by A. Bertram Chandler published in 1981.

Plot summary
The Anarch Lord is a novel in which John Grimes is given the job of Planetary Governor of Liberia when his Master Astronaut's Certificate of competency gets withdrawn.

Reception
Greg Costikyan reviewed The Anarch Lord in Ares Magazine #13 and commented that "A. Bertram Chandler isn't exactly the next James Joyce, but he's a pleasant man with whom to spend an evening."

Reviews
Review by Charles Platt (1982) in The Patchin Review, Number Three

References

1981 novels